Sandeep Mehta (born on 11 January 1963) is an Indian Judge. Presently, he is Chief Justice of Gauhati High Court. He was a Judge of Rajasthan High Court.

Career
He was enrolled as an Advocate on 8 August 1986. He practiced mainly in the Criminal and Constitutional matters. He was elevated as a Judge of Rajasthan High Court on 30 May 2011. He was appointed as Chief Justice of Gauhati High Court on 15 February 2023.

References 

Living people
1963 births
 Indian judges